Zendstation Ugchelen is the designation of a facility for FM- and TV-broadcasting at Ugchelen, Netherlands. Zendstation Ugchelen uses as transmission tower a  freestanding lattice tower built in 1959.

See also
Lattice tower

External links
Pictures Page (Dutch)

Radio in the Netherlands
Communication towers in the Netherlands
Towers in Gelderland
Buildings and structures in Apeldoorn
Towers completed in 1959